This is a partial list of fortifications in Bulgaria, including castles, castra, defensive walls, etc.

Partial list of fortifications in Bulgaria 

Bulgaria
Castles
Bulgaria
Castles